The 2012 J.League Division 1 season was the 47th season of Japanese top-flight football and 20th since the establishment of the J.League. The season started on March 10 and finished on December 1.

Sanfrecce Hiroshima won the 2012 J.League Division 1 championship on 24 November and advanced to the 2012 FIFA Club World Cup as the host team, entering the qualifying play-off round.
This was their first title in the J.League era and first league title since 1970, marking their sixth title overall.
Additionally, this was the first time since 1966 that clubs from the traditional regions of Kantō, Tōkai or Kansai – the corridor from Tokyo to Osaka – did not make the top two, and this time it was a team from Tōhoku, Vegalta Sendai, who finished in second place despite leading the table most of the season.

Clubs
Ventforet Kofu, Avispa Fukuoka and Montedio Yamagata were relegated at the end of the 2011 season after finishing in the bottom three places of the table. Avispa Fukuoka and Ventforet Kofu returned to J2 after only one season in the top flight, while Montedio Yamagata were relegated after three seasons in J1.

The three relegated teams were replaced by 2011 J.League Division 2 champions FC Tokyo, runners-up Sagan Tosu and third-placed team Consadole Sapporo. FC Tokyo made an immediate return to the top division, while Consadole Sapporo ended a three-year absence. In the end, Sagan Tosu reached J1 after thirteen seasons in the second division.

Foreign players

League table

Results

Season statistics

Top scorers

Source: J. League Division 1

Attendances

Awards

Individual Awards

Best Eleven

References

J1 League seasons
1
Japan
Japan